Benjamin Law (born 1982) is an Australian author and journalist. He is best known for his books The Family Law, a family memoir published in 2010, and the TV series of the same name. He hosts the radio programme and podcast Stop Everything for ABC Radio National.

Early life and education

Born in around 1982 Nambour, Queensland, to immigrant parents from Hong Kong and Malaysia,  He was educated at Immanuel Lutheran College on the Sunshine Coast.  He has a PhD in creative writing and cultural studies from the Queensland University of Technology (QUT).

Career
The Family Law is a family memoir published in 2010. It was a shortlisted nominee for Book of the Year at the 2011 Australian Book Industry Awards, and was adapted by Matchbox Pictures into a six-part television series for the SBS network in 2016, which Law created and co-wrote with Marieke Hardy (Series 1) and Kirsty Fisher and Lawrence Leung (Series 2). It won the Screen Producers Awards for Best Comedy (2016) and was nominated for two AACTA Awards.
In 2012 Law published  Gaysia: Adventures in the Queer East, a journalistic exploration of LGBT life in Asia.
At the 2012 Sydney Writers' Festival, he presented on the topic of bullying, for a panel with Wendy Harmer and Paul Capsis.

In November 2015, he advocated for gay people in a public discussion hosted by Mildura Pride (a Mildura Rural City Council Initiative). The social inclusion initiative focused on making Mildura more welcoming for LGBTIQ communities.

In April 2018, Law became an ambassador for the National Library of Australia.

As a journalist, he has contributed to publications including Frankie, The Australian Financial Review, The Saturday Paper, The Monthly (including a 2014 supplement on the Museum of Old and New Art), The Courier-Mail and its Qweekend supplement, Griffith Review, New Matilda, Fairfax Media's Good Weekend magazine, The Big Issue and Crikey.

Other roles

Law is founder member of the Australian Writers' Guild's Diversity and Inclusion Action Committee, along with Kodie Bedford and others.

Bibliography

Books
The Family Law (2010)
Gaysia: Adventures in the Queer East (2012)

Co-authored 
 Sh*t Asian mothers say, Collingwood, Vic. : Black Inc. (2014) – with sister Michelle Law
 Law School : sex and relationship advice from Benjamin Law and his mum Jenny Phang, Melbourne, Vic. Brow Books (2017)

Contributed chapters 
 "Tourism", pp. 147–152, and "Towards manhood", pp. 195–203, in: Growing up Asian in Australia, Melbourne, Black Inc. (2008)
 In: Voracious: best new Australian food writing, edited by Paul McNally, Prahran, Vic. : Hardie Grant Books (2011)
 In: I'm not racist but ... forty years of the Racial Discrimination Act, by Tim Soutphommasane, Sydney, N.S.W. NewSouth Publishing (2015)
 In: The book that made me, edited by Judith Ridge, Newtown, NSW Walker Books Australia (2016)
 "Beijing", pp. [43]-49, in: Best Australian comedy writing, edited by Luke Ryan, Affirm Press, South Melbourne, Victoria (2016)

Introductions 
 In: Me and Mr Booker, by Cory Taylor, Melbourne, Victoria : The Text Publishing Company (2017)

Essays and reporting

 "Chinese-Australian history predates the first fleet – and my family helped me find out how". The Guardian, 24 July 2019.

Interviews 
The women who shaped my life (August 2010). Cleo, pp. 100–102.
Morris, Linda (21 December 2012). "Benjamin Law". The Sydney Morning Herald, p. 6.
Tabart, Sally (July 2019). "A Day In The Life Of Benjamin Law, Writer". The Design Files.
Tabart, Sally (April 2020). "Times Like These... With Writer Ben Law". The Design Files.

As editor 
 Growing Up Queer in Australia (2019)

Filmography

Law's work includes: He is openly gay.

As writer

As actor

Other work

Theatre

Radio

References

External links 
 
 Austlit profile
IMDb page
Interview for No Filter
The Kids are Alright speech for Victorian Equal Opportunity and Human Rights Commission
Work for The Sydney Morning Herald 
Work for The Age

21st-century Australian male writers
Australian journalists
Australian memoirists
Australian people of Hong Kong descent
Australian people of Chinese descent
Australian gay writers
Gay memoirists
Living people
Writers from Brisbane
1982 births
Australian LGBT journalists
Australian LGBT rights activists
Australian people of Asian descent
21st-century memoirists
21st-century LGBT people
Australian Survivor contestants
21st-century Australian LGBT people